Samha is both a surname and a given name. Notable people with the name include:

 Mohamad Al-Khaled Samha (born 1958), Syrian-born Danish imam
 Samha El-Kholy (1925–2006), Egyptian musicologist

See also
 Samhah